Chen Sixi (born February 1958) is a Chinese politician.

Biography
Chen was born in Datian County, Fujian in 1958. He graduated from Beijing University in 1984. 

Chen was elected as the member of the NPC Standing Committee at the 11th National People's Congress in 2008, and was appointed as the Vice Chairman of the Internal and Judicial Affairs Committee.

References

External links
Profile of Chen Sixi at the website of National People's Congress

1958 births
Politicians from Sanming
People's Republic of China politicians from Fujian
Living people
Chinese Communist Party politicians from Fujian